Impatiens morsei is a species of flowering plant in the family Balsaminaceae. It is endemic to China, where it only occurs in Guangxi.

It is an annual plant with a succulent, purplish stem growing up to a meter tall. It produces white, pink, or purple flowers with orange throats. It grows in moist, shady habitat such as forest understory.

Sources

morsei
Endemic flora of China
Vulnerable plants
Taxonomy articles created by Polbot

It is not an annual